Heart of America is the debut full-length studio album by American country rap artist Ryan Upchurch. It was released on January 15, 2016 via RHEC Entertainment/Johnny Cashville, Inc. Production was handled by seven record producers: Kevin Grisham, BandPlay, BB Swing, Clock Work, Jonah Appleby, Super Staar, Travis Moore, with executive producer Johnny Cashville. It features guest appearances from Bubba Sparxxx, Luke Combs and Struggle Jennings. The album debuted at No. 30 on the Top Country Albums chart, No. 31 on the Independent Albums chart and No. 5 on the Heatseekers Albums chart in the United States.

Track listing

Charts

References

External links
Heart of America by Upchurch on Apple Music

Upchurch (musician) albums
2016 debut albums